Muxidi Station is a station on Line 1 of the Beijing Subway. The Line 16 station opened on December 31, 2022 and currently serves as an out-of-system interchange (OSI) with Line 1. It will connect with Line 18 in the future.

Station Layout 
Both the line 1 station and line 16 stations have island platforms.

Exits 
There are 10 exits, lettered A1, A2, B1, B2, C1, C2, D1, D2, E and F. Exits D1 and E are accessible.

Gallery

Suspension of Service in Early June 

During troop movements in Tiananmen Square protests of 1989, a lot of people were killed at Muxidi. Muxidi Station is often suspended about June 4 these years. For example:

 On June 3, 2013, A1 Exit of Muxidi Station was closed on the grounds of repairing.
 On June 2, 2014, Beijing Subway declared that A1 Exit and A2 Exit of Muxidi Station will be closed from June 3 (Tuesday) to a future date via Weibo.
 On June 2, 2015, Beijing Subway declared close of doors again. Reporters from Ming Pao found that they can't reply that Weibo post and other replies are invisible.
 On June 3, 2016, Beijing Mass Transit Railway Operation Corporation Limited declared that A1 Exit and A2 Exit will be closed from Today 15:00 (June 3) to a future date via Weibo. This message can not be replied.
 On June 3, 2017, A1 Exit and A2 Exit is closed. Beijing Mass Transit Railway Operation Corporation Limited didn't post any message but made a station broadcast on the grounds of "Temporary construction".
 On June 1, 2018, Beijing Mass Transit Railway Operation Corporation Limited declared that A1 Exit and A2 Exit will be closed from June 3, 2018 12:00 to last train of Muxidi Station via Weibo.
 On June 2, 2019, Beijing Mass Transit Railway Operation Corporation Limited declared that A1 Exit and A2 Exit will be closed from June 3 10:00 to a future date via Weibo.
 The station exits weren't closed in early June 2020, reporters of Now News noticed that there were plainclothes police, but fewer than before, stationed around the station.
Chinese activist Hu Jia believes that meanings of these measures are to prevent Tiananmen Mothers members from eulogizing the dead during the protest.

References

Beijing Subway stations in Xicheng District
Railway stations in China opened in 1971